Cathleen With is a Canadian writer and author. Skids, her debut short story collection about Vancouver street kids from the Davie Village to the Downtown Eastside, was published in 2006 and was shortlisted for the 2007 ReLit Awards. She was also shortlisted for the 2005 Western Magazine Award for her story "Carny", which was featured in Humanist Perspectives.

Her work has been published in several literary journals, including The Antigonish Review, Grain and Fireweed. Her first novel Having Faith in the Polar Girls' Prison was published with Penguin Canada in 2009 and won the Ethel Wilson Fiction Prize.

Life
Though her work is fiction, many of the stories in Skids are based on her friends' voices, some now gone, and her own experiences battling addictions and depression in her youth. With has also trained as a learning assistance, drama in education and English teacher, and works one on one with alternative youth who have trouble adapting to the public school system. She is currently a writing instructor in Vancouver.

Works
Optioned for Film: Skids
2012 Arsenal Pulp Press, Vancouver, British Columbia, Canada V6A: Writing from Vancouver's Downtown Eastside Editors John Asfour and Elee Kraljii-Gardiner
2009 Penguin Canada, Toronto, Ontario, Canada Having Faith in the Polar Girls' Prison
2006 Arsenal Pulp Press Vancouver, British Columbia, Canada Skids

References

External links
Cathleen With

21st-century Canadian novelists
Canadian women novelists
Writers from Vancouver
Living people
Canadian women short story writers
21st-century Canadian women writers
20th-century Canadian short story writers
21st-century Canadian short story writers
20th-century Canadian women writers
Canadian LGBT novelists
Year of birth missing (living people)
21st-century Canadian LGBT people